At the Night Side is the third live album by Buck-Tick, released on April 7, 2004. Its content was recorded at four different concerts in three different places; Hibiya Yagai Ongakudo on June 28 & 29 2003, NHK Hall on April 10, 2003, and Shibuya-AX on April 30, 2003. It reached number thirty-four on the Oricon chart.

Track listing 
 "Continue"
 "Nakayubi" (ナカユビ)
 "Heroine"
 "Limbo"
 "Zangai" (残骸)
 "Monster"
 "Buster"
 "Kirameki no Naka de..." (キラメキの中で･･･)
 "Mienai Mono o Miyo to Suru Gokai Subete Gokai da" (見えない物を見ようとする誤解 全て誤解だ)
 "Tight Rope"
 "Black Cherry"
 "Girl"
 "Baby, I Want You."
 "Genzai" (原罪)
 "Ai no Uta" (愛ノ歌)
 "Mona Lisa"
 "Sid Vicious on the Beach"
 "Cyborg Dolly: Sora-mimi: Phantom" (細胞具：ドリー：ソラミミ：Phantom)
 "Iconoclasm"

References 

2004 live albums
Buck-Tick albums